Michelle Ong is a Hong Kong jeweller, philanthropist and businesswoman. She is the co-founder and creative director of jewellery house Carnet.

Biography 
Ong was born in Hong Kong to parents who were both medical doctors. She studied sociology at the University of Toronto before returning to Hong Kong. A friend asked her to learn jewellery design and she later went into business with Israeli gem dealer Avi Nagar. The pair launched Carnet, a luxury jewellery brand, in 1985.

Ong has been active in a number of Hong Kong charities, including Hong Kong Philharmonic Society. In 2010 she founded her own charity, named First Initiative Foundation, which is instrumental in organisings local programmes to benefit the arts, education, community welfare while promoting Hong Kong’s culture on a world stage.

Personal life 
Ong is married to Emeritus Professor David Cheung, famed Cardiothoracic surgery and heir to the Garden Bakery businesses. The couple have three children Adrian, Amanda and Jennifer.

References

Living people
University of Toronto alumni
Jewellery designers
Year of birth missing (living people)